The 1975 Newfoundland general election was held on 16 September 1975 to elect members of the 37th General Assembly of Newfoundland. It was won by the Progressive Conservative party.

Results

Members elected
For complete electoral history, see individual districts

Notes

References
 Election Reports

Further reading
 

Elections in Newfoundland and Labrador
1975 elections in Canada
1975 in Newfoundland and Labrador
September 1975 events in Canada